El Rock del Mundial is a song by Chilean band  that was recorded for the 1962 FIFA World Cup in Chile. It is the best-selling single in Chilean music history, with over two million copies sold.

It was written by Chilean composer Jorge Rojas and Chilean producer Camilo Fernández.

References

External links

1962 FIFA World Cup
1962 singles
FIFA World Cup songs